Christian Gudegast (born February 9, 1970) is an American writer and filmmaker.

Biography

Gudegast is the only child of Dale Russell and German-born actor Eric Braeden (born Hans-Jörg Gudegast). He was raised and resides in Los Angeles. He graduated from the UCLA Film School in 1992.

He began his career as a rap music-video director and sold his first script, Black Ocean (co-written with his former partner Paul Scheuring), to Oliver Stone in 1993, launching his screenwriting career. He has done uncredited rewrites and production polishes on several major studio releases.

Gudegast is married and has three children.

Filmography
 A Man Apart (2003) - Screenwriter
 London Has Fallen (2016) - Screenwriter
 Den of Thieves (2018) - Producer, Director, Screenwriter

References

External links

Variety: Gudegast to direct "Den of Thieves"
New York Times: Christian Gudegast
Los Angeles Times: 'A Man Apart's' a Diesel vehicle if there ever was one

Living people
American male writers
American male screenwriters
Place of birth missing (living people)
American film directors
1970 births